= Charles Frederick Newham =

New Zealand photographer, filmmaker

- Born: 21 June 1880; Christchurch, New Zealand
- Died: 11 July 1960 (aged 80); Wanganui, North Island, New Zealand
- Occupations: Photographer, filmmaker

Charles Frederick Newham (21 June 1880 – 11 July 1960) was a New Zealand photographer and filmmaker.

Newham was born in Christchurch, New Zealand on 21 June 1880.

Newham died on 11 July 1960, aged 80, in Wanganui, North Island.
